Teisko TV-mast is a mast in Kämmenniemi, Tampere, Finland. It has a height of 325 metres (1066 feet), which makes it the highest structure in Tampere.

References

See also
List of tallest structures in Finland
Teisko

Buildings and structures in Tampere
Communication towers in Finland
Transmitter sites in Finland